Idrettslaget Norna-Salhus is a Norwegian athletics club from Salhus in Åsane, Bergen

It was founded on 14 October 1935. The club originally had an association football section as well, but it split away in 1987 to form FK Bergen Nord.

Since this split Norna-Salhus gradually rose to prominence in national athletics, especially within the jumping section. Triple jumpers Sigurd Njerve and Ketill Hanstveit established Norwegian records. Other athletes such as decathlete Benjamin Jensen, race walkers Kjersti Plätzer and Erik Tysse, and Mona Holm, Norwegian record holder in the women's hammer throw, has later joined Norna-Salhus.

References

Athletics clubs in Norway
Sport in Bergen
Sports clubs established in 1935
Defunct football clubs in Norway
1935 establishments in Norway